Robert T. Coles House and Studio is a historic home and architectural design studio located at Buffalo in Erie County, New York. It was designed and built in 1961, by locally prominent African American architect Robert T. Coles.  It consists of two prefabricated rectangular units arranged in an "L"-shape in the Modern style.  The studio unit is a single story and living unit is two levels.  It has post-and-beam construction with a variety of pre-fabricated, non-structural panels and sliding glass door units.  Coles once worked for the Techbuilt company under Carl Koch and the design of this dwelling reflects that experience.

It was listed on the National Register of Historic Places in 2011.  It is located in the Hamlin Park Historic District.

References

External links
Buffalo as an Architectural Museum: Robert T. Coles House and Studio

Houses on the National Register of Historic Places in New York (state)
Modernist architecture in New York (state)
Houses completed in 1961
Houses in Buffalo, New York
Architecture of Buffalo, New York
National Register of Historic Places in Buffalo, New York
Individually listed contributing properties to historic districts on the National Register in New York (state)